Eberhard Gottlieb Graff (10 March 1780 – 18 October 1841) was a German philologist.

He was born at Elbing, Prussia, and was educated at Königsberg, where he became professor of the German language in 1824. Influenced by the work of Jacob Grimm and Karl Lachmann, he followed in the footsteps of these eminent scholars, and produced several philological works distinguished by careful research, such as his valuable discussion on Old High German, entitled Althochdeutscher Sprachschatz (6 volumes, 1835–43). Other significant literary efforts by Graff include:
 Diutiska, Denkmäler deutscher Sprache und Literatur aus alten Handschriften, 3 volumes, 1826–29 – Diutiska, German language and literature from ancient manuscripts.
 Krist. Das älteste von Otfrid im neunten Jahrhundert, 1831 – Krist: the oldest, written by Otfrid in the ninth century.
 Deutsche Interlinearversionen der Psalmen, 1839 – German interlinear versions of the Psalms.

Notes

References

External links

1780 births
1841 deaths
German philologists
University of Königsberg alumni
Academic staff of the University of Königsberg
People from Elbląg
Germanists
Linguists from Germany